Irra can refer to:
IRRA, The Institute of Russian Realist Art
Lugal-Irra, a Sumerian, Babylonian, and Akkadian god
IRRA, an acronym in economics, finance, and decision theory for increasing relative risk aversion
IRRA, former pseudonym of Romanian singer and songwriter Irina Rimes